The Cook Islands United Party is a political party in the Cook Islands. The party was founded in October 2018 by former Cabinet ministers Nandi Glassie and Teariki Heather.

Heather contested the 2019 Ivirua by-election, but was unsuccessful. The party did not contest the March 2019 Tengatangi-Areora-Ngatiarua by-election, with Glassie instead standing as a Democratic party candidate.

In December 2021 the party announced eleven candidates for the 2022 Cook Islands general election. The party platform included a two-term limit for MPs and the introduction of import levies to promote local business. Initial results showed the party winning 4 seats, with a 5th seat tied. The final results gave the party three seats.

Electoral performance

Legislative Assembly

References

Political parties in the Cook Islands
Political parties established in 2018